A hornbill is a group of birds characterized by a long, down-curved bill, sometimes with a casque on the upper mandible.

Hornbill may also refer to:
Hornbill Festival, a Festival in Nagaland
Hornbill Films, a Chicago-based film distribution and production company
Hornbill Skyways, a regional charter helicopter service operating in towns and rural area in Sarawak, Malaysia
Hornbill TV, a Television channel in Nagaland
USS Hornbill, US Navy warships, active in World War II
Hawker Hornbill, 1925 military aircraft prototype